Highway 4 is the longest east–west main vehicle route on Vancouver Island, British Columbia, Canada, with a total length of .  It is known locally as the Alberni Highway to the east of Port Alberni and the Pacific Rim Highway to the west. The original highway from Parksville to Alberni and Port Alberni was completed in 1942 and was originally designated as Highway 1A. It was re-designated as Highway 4 in 1953, and was extended in 1961 to the district of Tofino, on the west coast of the Island.

Route details

Highway 4 veers directly west upon meeting this junction.

The majority of Highway 4's length is composed of a two-lane configuration. An inactive subdivision of the E&N Railway parallels Highway 4 all the way from the coast near Parksville to the city of Port Alberni.

West of Coombs Junction, Highway 4 travels for  before meeting Cameron Lake.

This winding bearing of Highway 4, which features very steep grades, continues for  before reaching the southeast shore of Kennedy Lake.

Major intersections
From east to west:

Highway 4A
Highway 4A is the previous alignment of Highway 4 east of Coombs.  The '4A' designation was originally assigned in 1968 to the current section of Highway 4 between Coombs and Qualicum Beach.  The 4 and 4A alignments east and north of Coombs, respectively, switched designations when the Parksville to Mud Bay section of the Inland Island Highway was completed in 1996.  This older spur of Highway 4 terminates in the east at Parksville,  from Coombs.

Major intersections

External links

 Official Numbered Routes in British Columbia by British Columbia Driving & Transportation

References 

004A
British Columbia Highway 04
Port Alberni